
Year 268 (CCLXVIII) was a leap year starting on Wednesday (link will display the full calendar) of the Julian calendar. At the time, it was known as the Year of the Consulship of Paternus and Egnatius (or, less frequently, year 1021 Ab urbe condita). The denomination 268 for this year has been used since the early medieval period, when the Anno Domini calendar era became the prevalent method in Europe for naming years.

Events

By place

Roman Empire 
 September – Battle of Naissus: Emperor Gallienus, aided by Aurelian, defeats a Gothic coalition (50,000 warriors) near Naissus (Niš, modern Serbia).
 Gallienus is killed by his own senior officers at Mediolanum (Milan) while besieging his rival Aureolus. Aureolus is murdered in turn by the Praetorian guard.
 Marcus Aurelius Claudius is charged, by the Senate, with having murdered Gallienus (it will never be proven). He becomes the new emperor of Rome and will reign as Claudius II.
 Claudius II asks the Senate to spare the lives of Gallienus's family and political supporters. Emperor Gallienus is deified and buried in a family tomb on the Appian Way.
 The Alamanni invade Italy north of the Po River.
 The Visigoths first appear as a distinct people.
 November – Battle of Lake Benacus: A Roman army (35,000 men) under emperor Claudius II defeats the Germanic tribes of the Alamanni along the banks of Lake Garda.

Europe 
 Victorinus is declared emperor of the Gallic Empire by the legions at Augusta Treverorum (Trier), following the murders of his predecessors. He is recognized by the provinces of Gaul and Britain, but Hispania might have reunited with the Roman Empire.

By Topic

Religion 
 December 26 – Pope Dionysius dies at Rome after a 9-year reign and is succeeded by Felix I.

Births

Deaths 
 December 26 – Dionysius, bishop of Rome
 Aureolus, Roman usurper
 Gallienus, Roman emperor (b. 218)
 Laelianus, Roman usurper
 Marcus Aurelius Marius, Roman emperor (Gaul)
 Postumus, Roman emperor of the Gallic Empire

References